Sir Annesley Stewart, 6th Baronet (1725 – March 1801) was an Anglo-Irish banker and politician. 

Stewart was the son of Ezekiel Stewart and Anne Ward. He was the Member of Parliament for Charlemont in the Irish House of Commons between 1763 and 1797. He was a banker in Dublin. 

He married Mary Moore, daughter of John Moore, in September 1755. On 14 August 1769 Stewart succeeded the baronetcy of his distant cousin, William Stewart, 1st Earl of Blessington. He was succeeded by his eldest son, James Stewart.

References

1725 births
1801 deaths
18th-century Anglo-Irish people
Baronets in the Baronetage of Ireland
Irish bankers
Irish MPs 1761–1768
Irish MPs 1769–1776
Irish MPs 1776–1783
Irish MPs 1783–1790
Irish MPs 1790–1797
Members of the Parliament of Ireland (pre-1801) for County Armagh constituencies